Julien Guay (born 9 October 1986 in Le Mans) is a French former professional cyclist.

Major results

2007
 7th Overall Tour de Gironde
2008
 1st Overall Tour de Gironde
1st Stage 3
 6th Overall Tour des Pyrénées
2010
 1st Stage 3 Tour des Pays de Savoie
 7th Overall Tour de Gironde
 9th Overall Tour de Normandie
2011
 4th Grand Prix de Plumelec-Morbihan
 6th Overall Paris–Corrèze
2012
 5th Overall Boucles de la Mayenne
 7th Grand Prix d'Ouverture La Marseillaise
 8th Overall Tour de Bretagne
2013
 1st Road race, Brittany Regional Road Championships
2014
 2nd Overall Rhône-Alpes Isère Tour
2015
 9th Tour du Finistère
2017
 8th Overall Tour de Bretagne
2018
 10th Overall Tour de Bretagne

References

External links

1986 births
Living people
French male cyclists
Sportspeople from Le Mans
Cyclists from Pays de la Loire
21st-century French people